Me You Madness is a 2021 American comedy thriller film, written, directed, produced by, and starring Louise Linton. It stars Linton and Ed Westwick.

It was released on February 12, 2021, by STXfilms.

Plot
Catherine Black, a wealthy and extremely intelligent corporate hedge fund manager and serial killer, has a high-fashion sense and spends her money on expensive cars, clothes, artwork, and furniture. She purposely lures Tyler Jones, a thief and gamer who steals from elderly individuals, including Black's grandmother, to apply for a job as house sitter of her large home in Malibu. As he cases the home, Black roofies him to knock him out, and then gets her nails done. When Jones awakes, Black's girlfriend arrives, and after feeding him organs of a frat boy while mocking him in Mandarin, they engage in an evening of drugs, sex, and bonding.

Black, after killing a man who was making suggestive faces at her in an exercise session, comes home and orders Jones to leave her house. While she takes a shower he steals her car and jewelry. She analyzes Jones' car's tracking device, calls him, and reads off the times and locations that he and his partner-in-crime, Chad, committed recent thefts. He brings the car and jewelry back in exchange for her not giving the Los Angeles police the incriminating evidence, but she explains that promises are meant to be broken. As they physically fight, and Jones runs from Black, he discovers her freezer full of human body parts, upping the stakes and forcing Black to vow to kill him even as it becomes obvious to both that they are madly in love.

Relaxing after their final series of fights, in which Black could have killed Jones by any of several methods, they simultaneously agree to marry. Black begins taking medication to control her need to kill, and Jones gives up a life of crime, finishes engineering school, and pays back Black's grandmother and his other victims. They have become vegans.

End credits show Catherine and Tyler happily raising a dog and three children.

Cast
 Louise Linton as Catherine Black
 Ed Westwick as Tyler Jones
 Shuya Chang as Yu Yan
 Jimmy Dinh as Tien Minh
 Tyler Barnes as Chad
 Gwen Van Dam as Grandma Betty
 Joel Michaely as Patrick

Production
In April 2019, it was announced Louise Linton and Ed Westwick had joined the cast of the film, with Linton directing from a screenplay she wrote, and serving as a producer under her Stormchaser Films banner.

Release
In November 2020, STX Entertainment acquired U.S. distribution rights to the film. It was released on February 12, 2021.

It was released on demand in the United Kingdom

Reception

Critical reception
Me You Madness received negative reviews from film critics. On Rotten Tomatoes it holds an 22% approval rating based on 11 reviews, with an average rating of 3.60/10.

On Metacritic the film scored only 7 out of 100, and was ultimately considered the worst film of 2021.

References

External links
 

American comedy thriller films
STX Entertainment films
2021 romantic comedy films
2021 thriller films
American serial killer films
2020s serial killer films
2020s English-language films
2020s American films